Eas Creag an Luchda is a waterfall of Scotland.

See also
Waterfalls of Scotland

References

Waterfalls of Scotland